Lake Chelan is a narrow,  long lake in Chelan County, north-central Washington state, U.S. It is an overdeepened lake and resembles a fjord, with an average width of . Before 1927, Lake Chelan was the largest natural lake in the state in terms of both surface area and water volume.

Because of overdeepening, the sides of this lake drop steeply to its bottom. Two communities lie on the southern end of the lake, and a third sits at the far north end, providing a gateway to the North Cascades National Park.

Hydrology
On an annual basis, an average of  flow into the lake. Approximately 75% of the water that flows into the lake comes from two tributaries. The Stehekin River alone contributes 65% of all water to Lake Chelan, averaging  annually. The other major tributary, Railroad Creek, averages  annually. The remaining water is added via a number of smaller tributaries as well as direct rain and snowfall.

The total watershed of the lake is  More than 90% of the watershed is forested land. The remainder of the basin is composed of the lake itself (5.6%) and agriculture (3.5%).

Geology
The fjord-like topography of the Lake Chelan valley results from repeated glacial erosion and deposition (maybe nine or ten times) during the Pleistocene Period. The last episode of glacial erosion and deposition in the basin occurred during the Last Glacial Maximum about 21,000 years ago. At that time, in the upper Similkameen River valley of British Columbia, the Skagit Lobe split from the Okanogan Lobe of the Cordilleran ice sheet and advanced south into the Skagit River drainage. Skagit ice passed through Fisher and Rainy passes, and down Bridge Creek into the Lake Chelan valley. The glacial lobe flowed down the Lake Chelan valley until meeting glacial ice of the main Okanogan Lobe advancing up the valley from the Columbia River drainage near Manson, Washington. The deposits of the northwestward advancing Okanagan lobe are characterized by large, basalt glacial erratics. As the Skagit Lobe during the Last Glacial Maximum and glacial lobes during older glaciations flowed to the southeast down the Lake Chelan valley, they excavated the deep glacial trough that is now occupied by Lake Chelan.

Basins
Lake Chelan is composed of two basins. The lower basin, Wapato, is shallower and approximately a fourth the total length of the lake. The upper basin, Lucerne, is much deeper and extends for the remainder of the length of the lake.

The lower basin, Wapato, is the shallower of the two, with a maximum depth of only . About  of glacial sediment and rockslide deposits rest between the lake bottom and bedrock. Due to the relatively modest size of this basin, water resides in this basin for only 0.8 years, compared to 10 for Lucerne Basin. Lucerne basin contains 92% of the water in Lake Chelan and 74% of the surface area, leaving Wapato with only 8% of the total volume of water and 26% of the surface area. The upper basin of Lake Chelan is surrounded by more mountainous terrain, resulting in few beaches along the shoreline.

Natural history

Climate
The climate of Lake Chelan's watershed is varied. From the southern end of the lake in the rain shadow of the Cascade Range, to the northern tip of the lake located in the eastern Cascades, the climate of Lake Chelan's watershed is as diverse as the lake is long. Other than precipitation trends, the climates are remarkably similar.

History

Etymology
The name Chelan is a Salish Indigenous word, "Tsi - Laan," meaning 'Deep Water'.

Cities
Due to the isolated nature of Lake Chelan, especially at its northern reaches, there is not a large population that resides along the shore. Chelan, which had 3,918 residents at the 2010 census, is currently the only incorporated city situated along the lake shore. The city is located at the southern terminus of the lake, adjacent to the Lake Chelan Dam and the Chelan River outflow. The census-designated place of Manson, which had 1,418 residents in 2010, is also located at the southern end of the lake. The unincorporated community of Stehekin, with approximately 75 residents, is located at the northern terminus of the lake, adjacent to the Stehekin River inflow. At the mouth of the Railroad Creek sits Lucerne, a small community of private cabins served by commercial boats. With approximately 50 long-term residents, Holden includes one of the few remaining public K-12 two-room schools in the contiguous United States.

Economy

Fishing
Fishing is a popular recreating activity on Lake Chelan. The following fish are or were native to the lake: Bull Trout, Westslope cutthroat trout, Largescale sucker, Longnose sucker, Bridgelip sucker, Northern pikeminnow, Peamouth, Redside shiner, Mountain whitefish, Pygmy whitefish.

In addition to these native species, six species have been introduced to the lake, primarily for sport fishing purposes: Yellowstone cutthroat trout, Rainbow trout, Kokanee, Brook trout, Chinook salmon, Lake trout

State records
In 2013, a  Lake Trout was caught, setting the state record.

Protected lands
At the north end of the lake, surrounding the town of Stehekin, is Lake Chelan National Recreation Area. Surrounding much of the lake on either side is Wenatchee National Forest. Two state parks are located on the southern edge, not far from the city of Chelan. These state parks are Twenty-Five Mile Creek State Park and Lake Chelan State Park.

In addition to the protected land located directly on the shores of Lake Chelan, Stehekin serves not only as a gateway to the Lake Chelan NRA, but also to the rest of the North Cascades National Park Complex, Stephen Mather Wilderness, and adjacent National Forest Wilderness Areas. Approximately 87% of the Lake Chelan watershed is owned by either federal, state, or local entities, with the rest in private ownership.

Gallery

See also
Uno Peak Fire

References

External links

Geology Tour of Lake Chelan by Ralph and Cheryl Dawes, Wenatchee Valley college.
Lake Chelan Geology hour-long lecture by Nick Zenter, Central Washington University.
National Park Service, Lake Chelan, Washington Geotourism, Washington.
University of Washington Libraries Digital Collections – Lawrence Denny Lindsley Photographs Includes 66 images (ca. 1907–1950) of Lake Chelan and nearby settlements.

Chelan
Chelan
North Cascades of Washington (state)
Tourist attractions in Chelan County, Washington